The mayor of Brampton is head of the executive branch of the Brampton City Council. The current mayor is Patrick Brown.

The following is a list of mayors of Brampton:

List
 John Haggert, 1874–February 1877
 James Golding, 1877–1879
 William A. McCulla, 1880–1882
 Matthew M. Elliott, 1883–1884
 Thomas Milner, 1886–1887 (died in office)
 A. F. Campbell, 1887–1888
 Thomas Holtby, 1889–1890
 Manton Treadgold, 1891–1892
 John T. Mullin, 1893–1894
 Edwin O. Runians, 1895–1896
 Edward H. Crandell, 1897–1898
 William Edwin Milner, 1899–1900
 Thomas Thauburn, 1901–1902
 Benjamin Franklin Justin, 1903–1905
 William Edwin Milner, 1906–June 1907
 C. A. Irvine, as Acting Mayor, June to July 1907, and as Mayor, July 1907
 Samuel Charters, August to December 1907
 James Golding, 1908–1909
 Thomas Thauburn, 1910–1911
 Samuel Charters, 1911–1912
 Thomas W. Duggan, 1912–1913
 Thomas Mara, 1914–1915
 A. H. Milner, 1916–1917
 Louis John Carpenter "L. J. C." Bull, 1918–1919
 William J. Beatty, 1920–1921
 John S. Beck, 1922
 Henry W. Dawson, 1923–1924
 Franklin W. Wegenast, 1925–1928
 George Akehurst, 1929–1930
 Franklin W. Wegenast, 1930–1931
 George Akehurst, 1931–1932
 John S. Beck, 1933–1934
 Ernest W. McCulloch, 1935–1936
 Wilfred J. Abell, 1937–1938
 Robert P. Worthy, 1939–1942
 William A. Bates, 1943–1944
 Bartholomew Harper Bull, 1945–1946
 John Stafford Beck, 1946–1948
 Harold R. Lawrence, 1949–1951
 B. Harper Bull, 1952–1954
 Nance Horwood, 1955–1958 (born Annie Barter)
 C. Carman Core, 1959–1962
 Russell E. Prouse, 1963–1966
 William H. Brydon, 1967–1969
 James E. Archdekin, 1970–1982
 Ken Whillans, 1982–September 1990, died in office
 Paul Beisel, 1990–1991, Whillans' appointed replacement
 Peter Robertson, 1991–2000
 Susan Fennell, 2000–2014
 Linda Jeffrey, December 1, 2014 – December 1, 2018
Patrick Brown, December 1, 2018–Present

Note that some publications credit C. A. Irvine as a mayor; he never served in this capacity.

Roads named after the mayors 
By neighbourhood:

 Eldomar Heights: Golding Avenue, Milner Road, Beatty Avenue, Core Crescent, Lawrence Crescent
 Flowertown area: Holtby Avenue, Campbell Drive, and Horwood Drive.
 Haggert Avenue, Treadgold Road (Humber West Parkway and Castlemore), McCulla Avenue (near Agnes Taylor P.S.), Elliott Street, Charters Road (Hansen and Vodden), Duggan Drive (Charolais and Chingaucousy), Mara Crescent (at Ken Whillians Drive), Dawson Crescent (Centre at Kennedy), Bates Court (Queen and Chinguacousy), Prouse Drive (Williams Parkway and Centre), Brydon Crescent (Queen and Chinguacousy), Archdekin Drive (at Rutherford Road, near Vodden), Ken Whillans Drive (Vodden to Church St.), Peter Robertson Boulevard (Dixie Road to Torbram Road)
 Abell Drive (Williams Parkway and Kennedy)
 In Peel Village, there is Bartley Bull Parkway (Steeles & Hurontario)

Runians, Thauburn, Irvine, Beck, Wegenast, Akehurst, McCulloch, Biesel and Fennell do not have roads named after them as yet.

The names last names of mayors Mullin, Justin, and Worthy were all rejected at one point or another. There is a Crandall Court, a different spelling than Mayor Crandell.

Statistics 
Shortest term as mayor 
 S. Charters at four months was preceded and succeeded by William Edwin Milner
Longest term as mayor 
 Susan Fennell, fourteen years (as of August 2014)
Mayors who died in office 
 Thomas Milner in 1887
 James E. Archdekin in 1982 (died from heart attack)
 Ken Whillans in 1990 (died on vacation)

References 

Brampton, Ontario